The 2012 Emir of Qatar Cup is the 40th edition of the cup tournament in men's football. It is played by the 1st and 2nd level divisions of the Qatari football league structure.

The top four sides of the 2011–12 Qatar Stars League season enter at the quarter-final stage.

The cup winner is guaranteed a place in the 2013 AFC Champions League.

Round 1

The first round of the competition involves four teams from the 2nd tier league.

| colspan="3" style="background:#9cc;"|15 April 2012

|}

Match details

Al Shamal and Al Shahaniya advance to round 2

Round 2

| colspan="3" style="background:#9cc;"|23 April 2012

|}

Match details

Al Arabi, Al Ahli, Qatar SC and Umm Salal advance to round 3

Round 3

| colspan="3" style="background:#9cc;"|27 April 2012

|}

Match details

Al Khor, Al Gharafa, Al-Wakrah and Al Kharitiyath advance to quarter-finals

Quarter-finals
The top four league finishers enter at this stage

| colspan="3" style="background:#9cc;"|5 May 2012

|}

Match details

El Jaish, Al Gharafa, Al Sadd and Al Kharitiyath advance to quarter-finals

Semi-finals

| colspan="3" style="background:#9cc;"|8 May 2012

|}

Final 

| colspan="3" style="background:#9cc;"| 12 May 2012

|}

References
Football Qatar
Goalzz.com

Football competitions in Qatar